Sketch for a Historical Picture of the Progress of the Human Mind is a work by the French philosopher and mathematician Marquis de Condorcet, written in 1794 while in hiding during the French Revolution and published posthumously in 1795. The first edition of An Essay on the Principle of Population (1798) by Thomas Malthus was largely written as a response to the work of William Godwin and Condorcet's Sketch, as is evidenced by its full title: "An Essay on the Principle of Population, as it affects the Future Improvement of Society with remarks on the Speculations of Mr. Godwin, M. Condorcet, and Other Writers".

Description
Condorcet's Sketch for a Historical Picture of the Progress of the Human Spirit was perhaps the most influential formulation of the idea of progress ever written. It made the Idea of Progress a central concern of Enlightenment thought. He argued that expanding knowledge in the natural and social sciences would lead to an ever more just world of individual freedom, material affluence, and moral compassion. He argued for three general propositions: that the past revealed an order that could be understood in terms of the progressive development of human capabilities, showing that humanity's "present state, and those through which it has passed, are a necessary constitution of the moral composition of humankind"; that the progress of the natural sciences must be followed by progress in the moral and political sciences "no less certain, no less secure from political revolutions"; that social evils are the result of ignorance and error rather than an inevitable consequence of human nature.

Condorcet's writings were a key contribution to the French Enlightenment, particularly his work on the Idea of Progress. Condorcet believed that through the use of our senses and communication with others, knowledge could be compared and contrasted as a way of analyzing our systems of belief and understanding through 10 epochs (stages). None of Condorcet's writings refer to a belief in a religion or a god who intervenes in human affairs. Condorcet instead frequently had written of his faith in humanity itself and its ability to progress with the help of philosophers such as Aristotle. Through this accumulation and sharing of knowledge he believed it was possible for any man to comprehend all the known facts of the natural world. The enlightenment of the natural world spurred the desire for enlightenment of the social and political world. Condorcet believed that there was no definition of the perfect human existence and thus believed that the progression of the human race would inevitably continue throughout the course of our existence. He envisioned man as continually progressing toward a perfectly utopian society. However, he stressed that for this to be a possibility man must unify regardless of race, religion, culture or gender.

Here is a quote from the 1795 English edition of his book:

References

External links
Outlines of an historical view of the progress of the human mind (1794)
Esquisse d’un tableau historique des progrès de l’esprit humain (1794)

1794 non-fiction books
1795 non-fiction books
Modern philosophical literature
Books published posthumously
Progress
Works about the theory of history